Tulia High School is a public high school located in Tulia, Texas, United States that is classified as a 3A school by the University Interscholastic League (UIL). It is part of the Tulia Independent School District located in central Swisher County. In 2013, the school was rated "Met Standard" by the Texas Education Agency. In 2005, The UIL One Act Play, performing scenes from “Into the Woods,” competed in the state UIL competition, taking home All Star Cast, Kaitlin Jones, Honorable Mention All Star Cast, Blane Womack and Andrew McCaslin.

Athletics
The Tulia Hornets compete in the following sports 

Baseball
Basketball
Cross Country
Football
Golf
Powerlifting
Tennis
Track and Field
Volleyball

State Titles
Girls Basketball 
1966(3A), 1967(3A), 1991(3A)
Girls Cross Country 
1980(3A)
Boys Golf 
1994(3A)

References

External links
Tulia ISD

Schools in Swisher County, Texas
Public high schools in Texas